Leendert Barth (born 11 January 1952 in Puttershoek) is a Dutch former football player. He was mainly a back-up goalkeeper who played his entire career in Belgium.

Playing career

Club
Barth started his career with Fortuna Vlaardingen. At the age of 19, he moved to RSC Anderlecht where he would soon become back-up goalie for Jan Ruiter, and later on for Jacky Munaron. Being denied a chance as first choice keeper, Leen Barth moved to a different Brussels side, Union SG. He stay there for one season.

In 1976, Leen Barth signed for Club Brugge. He play for them until 1981. Barth then went to cross city rivals Cercle Brugge where he remained until his retirement.

International
Leen Barth represented his country at youth level.

Managerial career
He became coach of lower league clubs, FC Knokke and SK Torhout, and then quit football.

Honours

Club
RSC Anderlecht
Belgian First Division (2): 1971–72, 1973–74
Belgian Cup (3): 1971–72, 1972–73, 1974–75
Belgian League Cup (2): 1973, 1974

Club Brugge
Belgian First Division (3): 1976–77, 1977–78, 1979–80
Belgian Cup (1): 1976–77
Belgian Supercup (1): 1980
European Champion Clubs' Cup: 1977-78 (runners-up)
Jules Pappaert Cup (1): 1978
Bruges Matins (1): 1979

Cercle Brugge
Belgian Cup (1): 1984–85

References

External links
Leen Barth at Clubbrugge.be 
Leen Barth at Cerclemuseum.be 

1952 births
Living people
People from Binnenmaas
Association football goalkeepers
Dutch footballers
Netherlands under-21 international footballers
Fortuna Vlaardingen players
R.S.C. Anderlecht players
Royale Union Saint-Gilloise players
Club Brugge KV players
Cercle Brugge K.S.V. players
Belgian Pro League players
Dutch expatriate footballers
Expatriate footballers in Belgium
Dutch expatriate sportspeople in Belgium
Footballers from South Holland